The Players may refer to:

In film
 The Players (2012 film), a French film also known as Les Infidèles
 The Players (2020 film), an Italian film also known as Gli infedeli

In music
 The Players Band, an American ska band 2000s
 The Players (American band), 1960s
 The Players (Malagasy band), 1970s, with Eusèbe Jaojoby a member from 1975 to 1979 when it disbanded
 The Players (Norwegian band), a Norwegian boyband

In organizations
 The Players (Detroit, Michigan), an amateur actor's club in Detroit
 The Players (New York City), Edwin Booth's historic actors' club in New York

In sports
 One side in the annual Gentlemen v Players cricket match
 The Players Championship, a golf tournament on the PGA Tour

See also 
 Players (disambiguation)
 Player (disambiguation)